Neurophyseta bolusalis is a moth in the family Crambidae. It is found in Brazil (Rio de Janeiro).

The wings are white with five luteous undulating brown-bordered bands, here and there connected by streaks.

References

Moths described in 1859
Musotiminae